First National Bank of Morrisville, also known as First Trust & Deposit Co. or Key Bank, is a historic bank building located at Morrisville in Madison County, New York.  It was built in 1864 and expanded in the 1890s, 1920s, and 1950s.  It is a single story brick building that features a finely detailed tetrastyle, Corinthian order portico.

It was added to the National Register of Historic Places in 1985.

References

Bank buildings on the National Register of Historic Places in New York (state)
Commercial buildings completed in 1864
National Register of Historic Places in Madison County, New York